Calonge is a municipality in the comarca of the Baix Empordà in Catalonia, Spain.

It may also refer to:
Calonge de Segarra, a municipality in Catalonia, Spain
Sant Antoni de Calonge, a town in Catalonia, Spain
Andrés Calonge (born 1945), Argentine sprinter
Jesús Muñoz Calonge (born 1976), Spanish footballer

See also
Calonga (disambiguation)
Calonges, a commune in the Lot-et-Garonne department in south-western France

Spanish-language surnames